Bleu de Gex (also Bleu du Haut-Jura or Bleu de Septmoncel) is a creamy, semi-soft blue cheese made from unpasteurized milk in the Jura region of France.

It is named after the Pays de Gex, a historical region in what is now France and Switzerland. During production, Penicillium roqueforti mold is introduced and the unwashed curds are loosely packed. It is then aged for at least three weeks. To meet Appellation d'Origine Contrôlée guidelines, it must contain only the milk of Montbéliard cows. It is milder and younger than the majority of French blue cheeses. Each wheel is stamped with the word "Gex".

Due to changes made in November 2004 to the official U.S. definition of "soft cheese", and the requirement that such cheeses from France must be made with pasteurized milk in French-certified plants, Bleu de Gex cannot be sold legally in the United States.

See also
 List of cheeses

References

Blue cheeses
Cheeses with designation of origin protected in the European Union
Cow's-milk cheeses
French cheeses